In mathematical finance, the volatility risk premium is a measure of the extra amount investors demand in order to hold a volatile security, above what can be computed based on expected returns.

It can be defined as the compensation for inherent volatility risk divided by the volatility beta.

Bibliography
 Options and the Volatility Risk Premium by Jared Woodard 2011, Financial Times Press ASIN B004JN0UIQ

References

Mathematical finance